Giovanni Migliorini (born February 21, 1931 in Milan) was an Italian professional football player. He died in 1980.

1931 births
Italian footballers
Serie A players
Como 1907 players
Inter Milan players
S.S. Lazio players
L.R. Vicenza players
A.C. Reggiana 1919 players
Association football forwards
A.C. Meda 1913 players
Living people